Pristimantis zimmermanae is a species of frog in the family Strabomantidae. It is found in the Amazonian Basin with records from Colombia (Amazonas Department), Bolivia, and Brazil.
Its natural habitats are tropical moist lowland forests, also occurring in secondary and degraded habitats. It is a common species.

References

zimmermanae
Frogs of South America
Amphibians of Bolivia
Amphibians of Brazil
Amphibians of Colombia
Amphibians described in 1991
Taxonomy articles created by Polbot